Hastings Catholic Schools is a private, Roman Catholic K-12 school system in Hastings, Nebraska, United States.  It is located in the Roman Catholic Diocese of Lincoln. 

The institution has two constituent parts: St. Michael's Elementary School and St. Cecilia Middle/High School, both on separate campuses.

Starting in the 2021 - 2022 academic year, the school will have an agricultural education program.

Athletics
St. Cecilia is a member of the Nebraska School Activities Association.  They have won the following NSAA State Championships:

 Boys' football - 2000, 2009, 2010 (runner-up - 1983, 1995)
 Girls' volleyball - 1982, 1983, 1987, 1989, 1990, 2013 (runner-up - 1986, 1988)
 Boys' basketball - 1958, 1969, 2008, 2009, 2010 (runner-up - 1959)
 Girls' basketball - 1977, 1978, 1979, 2011 (runner-up - 1982, 2014)
 Boys' track and field - 1993, 2001, 2010, 2011 (runner-up - 2005, 2009)
 Girls' track and field - 1971, 1972, 1973, 1974, 1975, 1976, 1977, 1980 (runner-up - 2009)
 Boys' golf - 2008 (runner-up - 2009)
 Boys' cross country - 2009

References

Further reading

External links
 School website

Roman Catholic Diocese of Lincoln
Catholic secondary schools in Nebraska
Private middle schools in Nebraska
Private elementary schools in Nebraska
Private K-12 schools in the United States
Schools in Adams County, Nebraska
Buildings and structures in Hastings, Nebraska